Teodor Salparov ( born 16 August 1982) is a Bulgarian volleyball player, a member of the Bulgaria men's national volleyball team and the Bulgarian club VC Hebar Pazardzhik. He was a participant in the Olympic Games (Beijing 2008, London 2012), and was a bronze medalist in the 2006 World Championship, 2007 World Cup and 2009 European Championship.

Career

Clubs
In 2014 went to Russian Zenit Kazan. In March 2015 he achieved gold medal of 2014–15 CEV Champions League with Russian club. In 2017 Salparov signed for Bulgarian Neftochimic. His teammates in Bulgaria national team Georgi Bratoev and Valentin Bratoev signed for the Burgas team the same year. With the Bulgarian team, Salparov became 2 time national champion.

National team
On September 4, 2009 Bulgarian national team, including Salparov, won the bronze medal at the European Championship 2009. They beat Italy in 3rd place match 3-0.

Sporting achievements

Clubs

FIVB Club World Championship
  2015 - with Zenit Kazan
  2016 - with Zenit Kazan

CEV Champions League
  2006/2007 - with Dynamo Moscow
  2009/2010 - with Dynamo Moscow
  2014/2015 - with Zenit Kazan
  2015/2016 - with Zenit Kazan
  2016/2017 - with Zenit Kazan

National championships
 2006/2007  Russian Cup, with Dynamo Moscow
 2006/2007  Russian Championship, with Dynamo Moscow
 2007/2008  Bulgarian Championship, with CSKA Sofia
 2008/2009  Bulgarian Championship, with CSKA Sofia
 2009/2010  Russian Championship, with Dynamo Moscow
 2014/2015  Russian Cup, with Zenit Kazan
 2015/2016  Russian Championship, with Zenit Kazan
 2016/2017  Russian Championship, with Zenit Kazan
 2017/2018  Bulgarian Championship, with Neftochimic Burgas
 2018/2019  Bulgarian Championship, with Neftochimic Burgas

National team
 2006  FIVB World Championship
 2007  FIVB World Cup
 2009  CEV European Championship

Individual
 2010 Memorial of Hubert Jerzy Wagner - Best Libero
 2012 Olympic Games London - Best Digger
 2015 CEV Champions League - Best Libero

References

1982 births
Living people
People from Gabrovo
Bulgarian men's volleyball players
Olympic volleyball players of Bulgaria
Volleyball players at the 2008 Summer Olympics
Volleyball players at the 2012 Summer Olympics
Galatasaray S.K. (men's volleyball) players
VC Zenit Kazan players
Bulgarian expatriate sportspeople in France
Bulgarian expatriates in Russia
Bulgarian expatriate sportspeople in Turkey
Expatriate volleyball players in France
Expatriate volleyball players in Russia
Expatriate volleyball players in Turkey